Mogamul is a 1995 Indian Tamil language film directed by Gnana Rajasekaran based on a novel of same name written by Thi. Janakiraman. The film stars Archana Joglekar, Nedumudi Venu and Abhishek, while Vivek and Vennira Aadai Moorthy play supporting roles. The score and soundtrack were composed by Ilaiyaraaja. The film opened in May 1995 to critical acclaim.

Plot
A musician falls in love with a woman who is the illegitimate daughter of a Brahmin from his village. But she refuses to accept him since she is 10 years older to him.

Cast 
Archana Joglekar as Yamuna
Nedumudi Venu as Ranganna
Abhishek as Babu
Vennira Aadai Moorthy
Vivek
Shanmugasundaram
Delhi Ganesh
Krishnankutty Nair
Kamala Kamesh as Ranganna's wife

Production 
The film marked the directorial debut of Gnana Rajasekaran, and he chose to make an art film based on a novel written by Thi. Janakiraman.

Soundtrack 
The song Kamalam Paatha is set in the Carnatic raga Ramapriya.

Release and reception 
The film won critical acclaim and went on to win a National Film Award for Gnana Rajasekaran, who secured the Indira Gandhi Award for Best Debut Film of a Director.

S. R. of Kalki appreciated the film's plot and direction and the performances of cast and crew.

References

External links 

1995 films
Films scored by Ilaiyaraaja
1990s Tamil-language films
Films based on Indian novels
Best Debut Feature Film of a Director National Film Award winners
1995 directorial debut films
Films directed by Gnana Rajasekaran